Michele Alboreto (23 December 1956 – 25 April 2001) was an Italian racing driver. He was runner up to Alain Prost in the 1985 Formula One World Championship, as well as winning the 1997 24 Hours of Le Mans and 2001 12 Hours of Sebring sports car races. Alboreto competed in Formula One from  until , racing for a number of teams, including five seasons (1984–88) for Ferrari.

His career in motorsport began in 1976, racing a car he and a number of his friends had built in the Formula Monza series. The car, however, achieved very little success and two years later Alboreto moved up to Formula Three. Wins in the Italian Formula Three championship and a European Formula Three Championship crown in 1980 paved the way for his entrance into Formula One with the Tyrrell team.

Two wins, the first in the final round of the  season in Las Vegas, and the second a year later in Detroit, earned him a place with the Ferrari team. Alboreto took three wins for the Italian team and challenged Alain Prost for the 1985 Championship, eventually losing out by 20 points. The following three seasons were less successful, however, and at the end of the  season, the Italian left Ferrari and re-signed with his former employers Tyrrell, where he stayed until joining Larrousse midway through .

Further seasons with Footwork, Scuderia Italia and Minardi followed during the tail end of his F1 career. In 1995, Alboreto moved on to sportscars and a year later the American IndyCar series. He took his final major victories, the 1997 Le Mans 24 Hours and 2001 Sebring 12 Hours, with German manufacturers Porsche and Audi respectively. In 2001, a month after his Sebring victory, he was killed testing an Audi R8 at the Lausitzring in Germany.

Career

1976–1981: Junior formulae
Michele Alboreto started his career in 1976 racing in Formula Monza with a car he and his friends built, known as the "CMR". The car itself proved to be uncompetitive and in 1978 Alboreto, now in a more competitive March, moved over to Formula Italia where he began to take race wins. Two years later Alboreto moved up to Formula Three, racing in a Euroracing-entered March-Toyota in both the European and Italian series. In his début Formula Three season, Alboreto finished 6th and 2nd respectively in the two championships, scoring three wins in the Italian series.

1980 would prove to be the Italian's final, and most successful, year in Formula Three where he took the European crown and finished third in the Italian championship, taking five wins between the two series. An appearance in the British Championship was also made that year.

Alboreto's European title earned him a move into Formula Two, a feeder series for Formula One, with the Minardi team. He scored Minardi's only F2 victory, at Misano, during the 1981 season where he finished eighth in the championship.

1980–1983: Sportscars
Despite his career in open wheel racing, Alboreto was chosen by Lancia to be part of their official squad in the World Championship for Makes, running in rounds which did not conflict with his other races. He shared the Group 5 category Lancia Beta Montecarlo with Walter Röhrl or Eddie Cheever on four occasions during the 1980 season, scoring three second-place finishes and a fourth.

Alboreto again ran a partial schedule in 1981 even though he was also running Formula Two and Formula One.  This season included his first participation in the 24 Hours of Le Mans. He earned an eighth-place finish overall, second in class, and was the highest finishing Lancia. He followed this with his first win in the championship, at the Six Hours of Watkins Glen with co-driver Riccardo Patrese. Alboreto finished the year 52nd in the Drivers' Championship, the highest ranked Lancia driver.

When Lancia chose to move to a new class of competition with the Lancia LC1 as the championship concentrated solely on endurance races in 1982, further success came for Alboreto. A small schedule for the championship, as well as an emphasis on European circuits allowed him to compete in every race that year. Although the LC1 suffered from mechanical problems on its debut, Alboreto and teammate Patrese were able to rebound to earn a victory at the 1000 km of Silverstone. Teo Fabi joined the duo for the 1000 km of the Nürburgring, where they once again earned a victory. He was not able to repeat his previous success at Le Mans when the LC1's engine failed, and was unable to complete an event at Spa when the car broke in the closing laps. A third victory was earned by Alboreto and new teammate Piercarlo Ghinzani at their home circuit, Mugello. The final two races of the World Championship season had Alboreto's car eliminated from contention due to accidents. At the end of the season, he had secured fifth in the Drivers' Championship.

Lancia changed classes and cars once again in 1983 World Sportscar Championship season, but Alboreto remained as one of the team's primary drivers. He brought the new Lancia LC2 to a ninth-place finish in its debut at the 1000 km of Monza, but the new car struggled to finish the next few races of the season. His entries would not finish another race until round five, where he earned eleventh. While Lancia chose to skip later rounds of the championship, he would not return to the team in order to concentrate fully on his commitments to Formula One. His troubles with the LC2 and early departure from the team earned him only two points in the championship.

Formula One

1981–1983: Tyrrell

At the age of 24, Alboreto made his Formula One debut at the 1981 San Marino Grand Prix for the Cosworth-powered Tyrrell Racing team, replacing Ricardo Zunino after the Argentine failed to impress team boss Ken Tyrrell. Unfortunately for the Italian, a collision with fellow countryman Beppe Gabbiani put him out of the race after completing 31 of the 60 laps. Alboreto failed to score a single point during his debut year, his highest position being ninth at the Dutch Grand Prix.

In comparison to the previous season, Alboreto had a more successful 1982 campaign. The Italian took the first podium of his Grand Prix career at Imola and, at the final round in Las Vegas, Alboreto took his first Grand Prix win. He is the last winner of the Caesars Palace Grand Prix as the following year, the track was axed from the calendar. Alboreto scored a total of 25 points during his second season of F1, finishing as the top Italian in eighth place overall.

Despite a win in Detroit, registered as the last victory for a naturally aspirated car until the end of the turbo-era in 1989, after Nelson Piquet's leading Brabham suffered a rear tyre deflation in the closing stages, Alboreto failed to finish in the points consistently and, with only one further points finish at Zandvoort, the Italian finished the season with ten points and down in twelfth position. However, it was announced that the Italian would partner René Arnoux at Ferrari. Replacing Patrick Tambay, he became the first Italian driver to race for the marque in over a decade.

1984–1988: Ferrari
In his debut season for Ferrari, Alboreto took victory in the third round at Zolder becoming the first Italian driver to win an F1 Grand Prix for Ferrari since Ludovico Scarfiotti won the 1966 Italian Grand Prix. He finished on the podium a further three times: at the Österreichring where he finished third; Ferrari's home circuit of Monza where he finished second; and at the Nürburgring, where he also finished in second place despite running out of fuel going into the final turn (the close following Brabham-BMW of reigning World Champion Nelson Piquet also ran out of fuel at the final turn allowing Alboreto to keep his 2nd place). Alboreto finished the 1984 season in fourth with 30.5 points, the half point coming from his sixth place at the Monaco Grand Prix which was cut to under half its original race distance due to heavy rain, resulting in half points being awarded.

 would prove to be Alboreto's most successful year in Formula One. He took two wins: the first at the Canadian Grand Prix, and the second at the German Grand Prix. Alboreto led the points table until Round 11 at Zandvoort, but finished the season in second place with 53 points, 20 points behind World Champion Alain Prost. Formula One journalist Nigel Roebuck commented that "Alboreto was Prost's only real challenger for the World Championship". Ultimately it was Ferrari's unreliability which cost Alboreto his chance at the World Championship as he failed to finish the final five races of the season all due to mechanical failure, though he was classified 13th in Italy despite his engine blowing on lap 45 of 51. At the 1985 European Grand Prix at Brands Hatch, after stopping to replace a flat-spotted tyre on lap 11, his Ferrari blew its turbo halfway through lap 13. Alboreto, frustrated that Ferrari's late season reliability had cost him the World Championship, drove the car back to the pits with the rear of the car on fire. He drove the on-fire car into the pits and straight to his Ferrari pit. Many observers saw this as Alboreto's way of showing that the Ferrari's unreliability had cost him the World Championship, which Prost won by finishing 4th in the race.

In  Ferrari's new car, the F1/86 designed by Harvey Postlethwaite, proved to be slower and less reliable than its predecessor as Alboreto retired from nine races, of which seven were mechanical failures. Alboreto only scored one podium, at the Austrian Grand Prix – even then both Williams cars of Nigel Mansell and Nelson Piquet had retired and Alboreto finished a full lap behind race winner Alain Prost. The Italian finished the season ninth in the Drivers' Championship with fourteen points. While the Ferrari V6 turbo was rated as one of the more powerful engines on the grid, both Alboreto and his teammate Stefan Johansson were hampered by the F1/86 which refused to handle on tracks which had a bumpy surface. Johansson finished 5th in the championship with 20 points despite being the #2 driver in the team, causing many to question why the team chose to re-sign Alboreto and let Johansson go.

Berger soon established himself as the team's number one driver thanks to his wins in Japan and Australia at the end of the season, while Alboreto could only manage a handful of podiums at Imola, Monaco and a second place at the final round in Australia to make it a Ferrari one-two. The Italian finished the year in seventh overall with 17 points, 13 points behind his teammate.

The 1988 season would be Alboreto's final year with Ferrari. With the McLarens of Ayrton Senna and Alain Prost dominating the season, the Ferrari team only managed a single win during the year at the Italian Grand Prix which Berger won from Alboreto in second place. Ferrari refused to offer the Italian a new contract and so Alboreto looked elsewhere for a drive. This announcement came at the French Grand Prix in July and pit lane rumours had Michele re-joining Tyrrell for 1989 (in France, where Alboreto finished 3rd and Berger a distant 4th, was the only time in 1988 the Italian would finish in front of the Austrian in a race where both finished). After France he received an offer from Frank Williams, head of the Williams team who would have exclusive use of the new V10 Renault engine in 1989. Later that year before the Italian GP at Monza, Alboreto had not received any word from Williams and requested confirmation of his seat at the team. Williams replied by saying that "he wanted him" and "not to move". At Monza, however, Williams announced he had signed Belgian Thierry Boutsen instead while also confirming that the teams number 2 driver, Alboreto's former Lancia sportscar teammate Riccardo Patrese, would be staying with the team. As it was late in the season, Alboreto was left with few options for the coming season.

Alboreto competed in eighty Grands Prix for Ferrari, which established a new record. It stood until the 1995 Argentine Grand Prix, when it was surpassed by Berger.

1989: Tyrrell and Larrousse
A lack of a drive had left Alboreto in a difficult situation and he later said that he contemplated retirement – an option of which his family were very much in favour. However, he was offered a drive at his former employer Tyrrell, which he accepted. The relationship between Alboreto and team boss, Ken Tyrrell, soon turned sour. At the Monaco Grand Prix, Alboreto was told to drive the 1988 model Tyrrell 017, due to the newer 018 model not being completed. Teammate Jonathan Palmer was chosen to drive the new monoshock 018. Meanwhile, the Italian would have to wait until the following day for the 018 and so he decided not to accept this. The result was Alboreto boycotting the Thursday practice session. Alboreto finished the race in fifth position during while Palmer finished ninth. This was followed by a strong performance at the next race in Mexico, where Alboreto finished 3rd – the only podium the team would achieve during the season.

By the French Grand Prix, Ken Tyrrell had found a new sponsor in Camel cigarettes for the race and told Alboreto to end his personal sponsorship deal with Marlboro, a rival brand to Camel. Alboreto was disappointed, as thanks to his Marlboro backing, the team had managed to fund his wages. Following Alboreto's refusal to cut his ties with his sponsor, Tyrrell replaced him with the up-and-coming Jean Alesi. Alesi finished fourth in his first Grand Prix for the team.

Alboreto soon lost his Marlboro sponsorship as well after they refused to find him another drive for the rest of the 1989 season. He was, however, soon hired by the French Larrousse team, incidentally co-sponsored by Camel, for the German Grand Prix and the rest of the season. Although his new teammate Philippe Alliot showed that the Lola LC89 with its  Lamborghini V12 engine could be a competitive car with high grid positions and challenging for points in various races, Alboreto failed to score a single point for the rest of the season, and twice he failed to pre-qualify. During qualifying for the Hungarian Grand Prix the Italian cut one of the chicanes and broke two of his ribs in the process. After competing the year for two teams, Alboreto finished the year eleventh in the Drivers' Championship with six points.

1990–1992: Footwork
 saw Alboreto move to the Arrows team, which was in the process of being sold to sponsor Footwork. It was seen mainly as a "transition year" for him, as the chassis was in its second year and severe uncompetitiveness would be expected. Despite this, the 33-year-old finished in the top ten a number of times and only retired three times. Alboreto finished the season, however, as one of 21 drivers who failed to score a point.

The package did not, however, live up to its expectations as it failed to qualify a number of times. Soon the overweight and unreliable Porsche engines were replaced by Hart-supplied Cosworth engines for the rest of the season, the short-term fix not improving the team's competitiveness. This would be Alboreto's second season in succession that he failed to score a point.

The FA13 was reliable in comparison to its predecessor and Alboreto scored points four times, in addition to finishing in seventh place six times. With a season total of six points, the 35-year-old finished the year tenth overall.

1993–1994: Scuderia Italia and Minardi

Alboreto joined Italian team Scuderia Italia, which had enjoyed a number of successes in its short history, most notably when Andrea de Cesaris and JJ Lehto had scored podium positions at the 1989 Canadian Grand Prix and 1991 San Marino Grand Prix respectively. At the start of 1993, however, the team moved away from its Dallara-built chassis and onto Lolas, a move considered "disastrous" by many Grand Prix journalists. The Italian failed to score any points over the year, and failed to qualify several times as the slowest runner in the 26-car field.

The Minardi cars proved to be mostly uncompetitive and unreliable, with a total of nine retirements from sixteen rounds. A sixth position in Monaco was Alboreto's only points finish. At the 1994 San Marino Grand Prix, which was overshadowed by the deaths of Ayrton Senna and Roland Ratzenberger, whilst leaving the pitlane after a scheduled stop, Alboreto's car lost his loose right rear wheel which bounced through the Benetton, Ferrari, and Lotus pit areas and crews, injuring several mechanics. At the end of the season, he decided to retire from Grand Prix racing, with a record of 194 starts and five Grand Prix wins.

1994–2001: Post-Formula One career
Following his departure from Formula One in 1995, Alboreto embarked on a career in the German Touring Car Championship, known as the Deutsche Tourenwagen Meisterschaft. Racing for Alfa Romeo's factory team, Alfa Corse, the Italian finished 22nd in the championship, scoring four points. Further entries in the International Touring Car Championship and World Sportscar Championship, the latter being with Ferrari, also proved to be fruitless ventures.

Alboreto returned to open-wheel racing in 1996, entering the newly formed Indy Racing League (IRL) with Scandia/Simon Racing. The then 39-year-old competed in all three rounds where he finished fourth on his debut at Walt Disney World Speedway; eighth at the Phoenix International Raceway; and retired, due to gearbox problems, at the 1996 Indianapolis 500, his sole entry into the race. Alboreto also ran sports prototypes for Scandia/Simon while in the United States, entering the IMSA World Sports Car Championship with a Ferrari 333 SP. He also entered the Le Mans 24 Hours in a Joest Racing-entered Porsche WSC-95 alongside fellow Italian and former F1 teammate Pierluigi Martini and Belgian Didier Theys, but retired due to an engine failure after completing 300 laps. The following year, Alboreto earned his first and only podium in the IRL at the "True Value 200" held in New Hampshire, where he finished third. A further fifth place at Las Vegas earned Alboreto 62 points during his 1997 campaign which resulted in a 32nd place overall in the drivers' championship.

Also in 1997, Alboreto was called to testify at the trial following Ayrton Senna's fatal accident in 1994. He told the tribunal that, in his opinion, Senna's accident was likely caused by a technical failure rather than a driver error.

Alboreto won the 1997 24 Hours of Le Mans with the same car as the previous year, but this time alongside Swede Stefan Johansson,  another former F1 teammate, and Dane Tom Kristensen, who would later go onto beat Jacky Ickx's record for winning the most Le Mans 24 Hour races. The trio completed 361 laps, one more than second placed Gulf Team Davidoff's BMW-powered McLaren F1 GTR. This would prove to be the peak of Alboreto's sportscar success as he failed to finish at Le Mans in 1998 with Porsche once again. However, a fourth place at the 1999 24 Hours of Le Mans with the newcomer Audi, a third at the 2000 Le Mans 24 Hours, a victory at the 2000 Petit Le Mans and a win at the 2001 Sebring 12 Hours gave the Italian some final success prior to his death a month after his win at Sebring.

Death

In late April 2001, Alboreto and a small group of Audi engineers travelled to the EuroSpeedway Lausitz near Dresden in eastern Germany to perform a series of tests on an Audi R8 in preparation for their participation at the 24 Hours of Le Mans in June. Alboreto mainly drove the car in the area of the facility that is used for public racing events, using the tri-oval for quicker laps and the Grand Prix circuit for slower laps, but some testing also took place within the limits of the adjacent proving ground, which features an elongated oval track with two long straights.

Around 5.30 p.m. local time on 25 April 2001, Alboreto accelerated the R8 along one of the two long straights at the proving ground. When the car reached the speed of approximately 300 kph, its left rear tyre failed. The R8 was subsequently launched into the air, somersaulting over the Armco barrier and landing inverted. Alboreto's head struck the ground, killing him instantly. Initially, Audi gave no reason for the crash, stating the R8 had "already completed thousands of test kilometres on numerous circuits without any problems." Five days later, an investigation into the accident was reported to have concluded. The tyre failure was attributed to a gradual loss of air pressure, caused by a loose screw that had found its way into the tyre. As there was no indication of a mechanical problem or driver error, the tyre failure was determined to be the sole cause of the crash. The finding motivated Audi to expedite the implementation of a new sensor-based TPMS in their racecars.

Alboreto's death brought much anguish among his family and friends. Michele's cousin Marisa told Italian news agency ANSA "You can't imagine what we're going through as a family. We're really distraught."

Legacy
Fellow Italian Giancarlo Fisichella dedicated his podium finish at the 2005 Italian Grand Prix to Alboreto, "I know Alboreto was the last Italian on the podium at Monza before me. I was lucky enough to race together with him in touring cars, and he was a great person, really special. I want to dedicate the result to his memory."

On 28 August 2021, it was announced that the final corner at Monza, the Curva Parabolica, will be officially renamed the Curva Alboreto during the 2021 Italian Grand Prix weekend to mark the 20th anniversary of Alboreto's death.

Helmet
Alboreto's helmet was blue with a yellow stripe with white edges covering the centre of the helmet. The colours were a tribute to Swedish driver Ronnie Peterson, whose helmet design also used them to reflect the Swedish flag. Alboreto and Peterson first met in 1972 and were friends until the Swedish driver's death in 1978.

Racing career results

Career summary

Complete World Sportscar Championship results
(key) (Races in bold indicate pole position) (Races in italics indicate fastest lap)

Footnotes

Complete 24 Hours of Le Mans results

Complete European Formula Two Championship results
(key) (Races in bold indicate pole position; races in italics indicate fastest lap)

Complete Formula One World Championship results
(key) (Races in bold indicate pole position; races in italics indicate fastest lap)

† Did not finish, but was classified as he had completed more than 90% of the race distance.
‡ Race was stopped with less than 75% of laps completed, half points awarded.

Complete Deutsche Tourenwagen Meisterschaft results
(key) (Races in bold indicate pole position) (Races in italics indicate fastest lap)

Complete International Touring Car Championship results
(key) (Races in bold indicate pole position) (Races in italics indicate fastest lap)

American Open-Wheel racing results
(key) (Races in bold indicate pole position)

Indy Racing League

Indianapolis 500

Complete American Le Mans Series results
(key) (Races in bold indicate pole position) (Races in italics indicate fastest lap)

References

Websites

Race results taken from:
Formula One – 
Formula Two – 
IndyCar – 
Sportscars –

Notes

External links

 Michele Alboreto in focus

1956 births
2001 deaths
24 Hours of Le Mans drivers
24 Hours of Le Mans winning drivers
American Le Mans Series drivers
Arrows Formula One drivers
Deutsche Tourenwagen Masters drivers
FIA European Formula 3 Championship drivers
European Formula Two Championship drivers
Ferrari Formula One drivers
Formula One race winners
Indianapolis 500 drivers
IndyCar Series drivers
Italian Formula One drivers
Italian Formula Three Championship drivers
Italian expatriate sportspeople in Germany
Larrousse Formula One drivers
Minardi Formula One drivers
Racing drivers who died while racing
Scuderia Italia Formula One drivers
Sport deaths in Germany
Racing drivers from Milan
Tyrrell Formula One drivers
World Sportscar Championship drivers
12 Hours of Sebring drivers
Audi Sport drivers
Team Joest drivers
Porsche Motorsports drivers